The results for some scales of some psychometric instruments are returned as sten scores, sten being an abbreviation for 'Standard Ten' and thus closely related to stanine scores.

Definition 
A sten score indicates an individual's approximate position (as a range of values) with respect to the population of values and, therefore, to other people in that population.  The individual sten scores are defined by reference to a standard normal distribution.  Unlike stanine scores, which have a midpoint of five, sten scores have no midpoint (the midpoint is the value 5.5).  Like stanines, individual sten scores are demarcated by half standard deviations.  Thus, a sten score of 5 includes all standard scores from -.5 to zero and is centered at -0.25 and a sten score of 4 includes all standard scores from -1.0 to -0.5  and is centered at -0.75.  A sten score of 1 includes all standard scores below -2.0.  Sten scores of 6-10 "mirror" scores 5-1.  The table below shows the standard scores that define stens and the percent of individuals drawn from a normal distribution that would receive sten score.

Percentiles are the percentile of the sten score (which is the mid-point of a range of z-scores).

Sten scores (for the entire population of results) have a mean of 5.5 and a standard deviation of 2.

Calculation of sten scores 

When the score distribution is approximately normally distributed, sten scores can be calculated by a linear transformation:  (1) the scores are first standardized; (2) then multiplied by the desired standard deviation of 2; and finally, (3) the desired mean of 5.5 is added.  The resulting decimal value may be used as-is or rounded to an integer.

For example, suppose that scale scores are found to have a mean of 23.5, a standard deviation of 4.2, and to be approximately normally distributed. Then sten scores for this scale can be calculated using the formula, .  It is also usually necessary to truncate such scores, particularly if the scores are skewed.

An alternative method of calculation requires that the scale developer prepare a table to convert raw scores to sten scores by apportioning percentages according to the distribution shown in the table.  For example, if the scale developer observes that raw scores 0-3 comprise 2% of the population, then these raw scores will be converted to a sten score of 1 and a raw score of 4 (and possibly 5, etc.) will be converted to a sten score of 2.  This procedure is a non-linear transformation that will normalize the sten scores and usually the resulting stens will only approximate the percentages shown in the table.  The 16PF Questionnaire uses this scoring method.

References 

Psychometrics